The Sri Lanka Army Service Corps  (SLASC) is a Combat Support corps of the Sri Lanka Army. The role of the corps is to carry supplies to the soldier where he is, and run an efficient organization for the provision of transport, fuel, oil and lubricants which are the 'life blood of an army’. It is made up of 7 regular units and one volunteer (reserve) units and is headquartered at its Regiment Center at the Panagoda Cantonment, Panagoda. The corps has a trade school in Anuradhapura which trains drivers, cooks and clerks for the Army.

Units
1st Regiment Sri Lanka Army Service Corps
3rd Regiment Sri Lanka Army Service Corps
4th Regiment Sri Lanka Army Service Corps
5th Regiment Sri Lanka Army Service Corps
6th Regiment Sri Lanka Army Service Corps
7th Regiment Sri Lanka Army Service Corps
8th Regiment Sri Lanka Army Service Corps

Volunteers
2nd Volunteer Regiment Sri Lanka Army Service Corps (Formed on 12 April 2018)
9th Volunteer Regiment Sri Lanka Army Service Corps (Formed on 20 March 2018)

Notable members
Chinthaka De Soyza

Alliances
 - Royal Army Service Corps

Order of precedence

See also
 Sri Lanka Army

External links and sources
 Sri Lanka Army
 Sri Lanka Army Service Corps
 Sri Lanka Army Service Corps: The Hundred Year Journey Blog

Service Corps
Service Corps